The 2014 Winton 400 was a motor race meeting for the Australian sedan-based V8 Supercars. It was the third event of the 2014 International V8 Supercars Championship. It was held on the weekend of 4–6 April at the Winton Motor Raceway, near Winton, Victoria.

References 

Winton